{|
{{Infobox ship image
| Ship image = HMS Raven (1856).jpg
| Ship caption = Surlys sister ship Raven, built to the same design
}}

|}HMS Surly was an Albacore-class gunboat built for the Royal Navy.  She was constructed in Newcastle by T & W Smith as part of the second batch, ordered in early October 1855, and was launched on 18 March 1856. After commissioning she served in the Steam Reserve and Coastguard Reserve. She was sold out of service in 1869.

 Description 

The order for Surly was placed with T & W Smith on 4 October and her keel was laid in Newcastle on 15 October.Surly was fitted with three cylindrical boilers and a horizontal single expansion direct acting  engine supplied by Maudslay, Sons & Field. The vessel was launched on schedule on 18 March 1856, and commissioned into the Royal Navy on 5 July, having cost £9,867, of which the hull accounted for £5,656 and machinery £3,298.

The Albacore-class were armed with a single muzzle-loaded smoothbore 68-pounder gun (95 cwt; barrel length 10 feet) mounted on a pivot at aft, and a muzzle-loaded smoothbore 32-pounder gun (56 cwt; barrel length 9.5 feet) at the ships' forward.  They were also fitted with two 24-pounder howitzers on broadside gun carriages. The Albacore-class  carried a crew of 36-40 men.

 Service 

Upon commissioning Surly went straight into the Royal Navy's Steam Reserve at Sheerness Dockyard.  In April 1861 she was serving with the Coastguard Reserve at Hull as tender to HMS Cornwallis and later HMS Dauntless.  In Royal Navy service Surlys signal letters were GTWB.  Surly was paid off in April 1869 and sold out of service at public auction on 21 October 1869, making £1,025.

References 

1856 ships
Ships built on the River Tyne
Gunboats of the Royal Navy
Albacore-class gunboats (1855)